Jean-Baptiste Paternotte (born 4 January 1981) is a French football player who plays in Belgium for Union Royale Namur. He has also played for A.F.C. Tubize and CS Sedan in the Championnat National.

References

1981 births
Living people
People from Noyon
French footballers
Association football defenders
CS Sedan Ardennes players
US Roye-Noyon players
AFC Compiègne players
French expatriate footballers
Expatriate footballers in Belgium
A.F.C. Tubize players
French expatriate sportspeople in Belgium
R. Olympic Charleroi Châtelet Farciennes players
Expatriate footballers in Hungary
Szombathelyi Haladás footballers
French expatriate sportspeople in Hungary
Union Royale Namur Fosses-La-Ville players
Sportspeople from Oise
Footballers from Hauts-de-France